Shrimp chips may refer to:

Prawn cracker, a Southeast Asian shrimp cracker which comes in many varieties
Kappa Ebisen, a popular shrimp flavored Japanese snack
Saeukkang, a popular Korean shrimp cracker, produced by Nongshim